The Rocket to the Moon is a 1928 science fiction novel by the German writer Thea von Harbou. Its German title is Die Frau im Mond, which means "The Woman in the Moon". It is about a fictitious Moon mission. The book was translated into English by Baroness von Hutten and published in 1930 as The Girl in the Moon. It was republished in 1977 as The Rocket to the Moon.

Adaptation
The book was turned into a film by Fritz Lang, Harbou's husband. The film is titled Woman in the Moon and premiered in 1929.

References

See also 
 1928 in science fiction

1928 German-language novels
1928 science fiction novels
1928 German novels
German novels adapted into films
German science fiction novels
Novels set on the Moon
Novels by Thea von Harbou
Space exploration novels
Science fiction novels adapted into films